The English Classic was a professional golf tournament which was played annually from 1979 to 1983. It was a fixture on the European Tour schedule, and hosted at The Belfry in Wishaw, Warwickshire, England.

Two of the five winners were major championship winners and World Number 1 golfers, namely the Australian Greg Norman and the Spaniard Seve Ballesteros. In 1983 the prize fund was £90,000, which was mid range for a European Tour event at that time.

Winners

External links
Coverage on the European Tour's official site

Former European Tour events
Golf tournaments in England
Sport in Warwickshire
Defunct sports competitions in England
Recurring sporting events established in 1979
Recurring sporting events disestablished in 1983
1979 establishments in England
1983 disestablishments in England